Cyanonectria is a genus of fungi belonging to the family Nectriaceae.

The species of this genus are found in Europe.

Species:

Cyanonectria buxi

References

Nectriaceae
Nectriaceae genera